Ioannis Paraskevopoulos (25 December 1900 – 8 April 1984), was a Greek banker and politician who served twice as interim Prime Minister of Greece during the 1960s. He was born in Lavda, Elis.

References

1900 births
1984 deaths
20th-century prime ministers of Greece
People from Andritsaina
Prime Ministers of Greece
Ministers of National Defence of Greece
1960s in Greek politics